Icehouse or ice house may refer to:

 Ice house (building), a building where ice is stored
 Ice shanty, a shelter for ice fishing also known as an Icehouse
 Ice skating rink, a facility for ice skating.
 Ice hockey arena, an area where ice hockey is played--often professionally.

Places
 The Ice House, a folk music- turned comedy-club in Pasadena, California
The Ice House (Flagstaff, Arizona), listed on the National Register of Historic Places
 Ice House (Moulton, Alabama), listed on the National Register of Historic Places
 Tugnet Ice House, a category A listed building in Scotland, the largest of its kind remaining in the UK 
 The Icehouse (business growth centre), a business growth centre in New Zealand
 London Ice House, an arena in London, Ontario, Canada
 Medibank Icehouse (Winter Olympic Institute of Australia), Australia's only dual ice skating and ice sports venue
 Vivekanandar Illam, a palace at Chennai, India, also known as Ice House

Music
 Icehouse (band), an Australian rock band from 1981, formerly known as Flowers (1977-1981)
 Icehouse (album), the 1980 debut Australian rock album by band Flowers, later called Icehouse
 "Icehouse (song)", the title track, released as a single in 1981 by Icehouse

Film

 Ice House (film), a 1989 film starring Melissa Gilbert and Bo Brinkman

Other
 Icehouse (beer), a brand of American beer
 Icehouse pieces, nestable and stackable pyramid-shaped pieces with which the abstract strategy game Icehouse and many other games are played
 Icehouse Earth, a climate state describing glaciated periods of Earth history

See also
 The Ice House (disambiguation)